Norbu Dondrup (born December 1960) is an ethnic Tibetan politician of China. He is the Executive Vice Chairman of Tibet Autonomous Region and a member of the Standing Committee of the CPC Tibet Autonomous Region Committee.

Biography
Norbu Dondrup was born in Qonggyai County, Tibet Autonomous Region, China in December 1960. Both his parents and grandparents were serfs and slaves. In September 1975, by age 14, he entered the Central Political and Legal Cadre School (now People's Public Security University of China}, where he graduated in August 1978. 

After university, he joined the Shannan Public Security Bureau, where he was promoted to become its chief in September 1995. In July 1998 he was transferred to Lhasa and appointed police chief and a member of the Standing Committee of the CPC Lhasa Committee. He was Deputy Communist Party Secretary of Lhasa in July 2001, and held that office until September 2006. In December 2002, at the age of 41, he became Mayor of Lhasa, and served until September 2006.  He served as Executive Vice Chairman of Higher People's Court of Tibet Autonomous Region in September 2006, and four months later promoted to the Chairman position. In November 2011 he was transferred to Chamdo and appointed Communist Party Secretary, a position he held until April 2017. In December 2016 he was promoted to Executive Vice Chairman of Tibet Autonomous Region.

He was a delegate to the 10th National People's Congress and a delegate to the 18th National Congress of the Communist Party of China. He is an alternate member of the 19th Central Committee of the Communist Party of China.

References

1960 births
Living people
Chinese People's Public Security University alumni
Central Party School of the Chinese Communist Party alumni
People's Republic of China politicians from Tibet
Chinese Communist Party politicians from Tibet
Mayors of Lhasa
Delegates to the 10th National People's Congress